Byung-nam Moon graduated from the Department of Dance in Chosun University, in 1984 and the Graduate School, dept. of dance of Sejong University in 1998. He entered Korea National Ballet in 1984 and took the leading roles in all performances of the company until 1992. Also he studied at the Tokyo City Ballet in 1988. He was selected as beneficiary for overseas training by the Arts Council Korea to study in the U.S. in 1989. He worked as one of the ballet masters in the Korea National Ballet in 1993. In 1996, he went to Russia to complete the doctoral course in the Sankt Peterburg National University of Culture and Art and obtained a ph.D in Culture. He studied choreography at the Sankt Peterburg Boris Eifman Ballet in 1997. He worked as a senior choreographer and one of the ballet masters in the Korea National Ballet from 1999 to 2002 and has enthusiastically worked as an assistant artistic director of the Korea National Ballet since 2005. He recently choreographed Prince Hodong as a first release of the national representative project, which has become a hot issue in the world of ballet.

Awards
1986 Best performer at the Korea Dance Festival
1987 Honorary award at the 25th anniversary of the Korea National Ballet's foundation
1987 Minister prize of the Ministry of Culture in commemoration of '86 Asian Game'
1988 Minister prize of the Ministry of Athletics in commemoration of '88 Cultural Olympic'
1990 Best starring role of the Korea Ballet Association
1992 Honorary award at the 30th anniversary of the Korea National Ballet' foundation

Choreography
Dynamic
Three Dimensional
Divertimento
A death of a general
Carmen
Prince Hodong

Performance
Swan Lake
The Nutcracker
Les Sylphides
Prince Hodong
The Hunchback of Notre Dame
Giselle
Don Quixote
Romeo and Juliet
Carmen

References 

https://web.archive.org/web/20111009041645/http://www.kballet.org/

South Korean male ballet dancers
Living people
Place of birth missing (living people)
Year of birth missing (living people)